Ray Zirkelbach (born October 20, 1978) is a former state legislator, prison counselor and soldier. He was raised on a farm in Scotch Grove, Iowa and graduated from Monticello High School in 1997. Zirkelbach served in the Iowa House of Representatives, representing the 31st District, from 2005 to 2011. He was deployed in Iraq as an Iowa National Guard sergeant, in the First Battalion of the 133rd Infantry. He holds a BA from the University of Wyoming in Administration of Justice.

He did not sit in the 2006 or 2007 session of the Iowa House, because he was on active duty with the Iowa National Guard in Iraq.

During his last term in the Iowa House, he was Chair of the Veterans Affairs Committee and a member of the Appropriations, Commerce and Agricultural committees, and was selected to serve on the Justice Systems Appropriations Committee.

Ray has since continued his public service as a correctional counselor at the Anamosa State Penitentiary and program director of Advancement Services of Jones County. He has focused his efforts in community restoration projects and has since purchased and actively renovates properties in the area.

On November 8, 2015, Zirkelbach announced he will be exploring a campaign for US Senate.

Zirkelbach declined pursuing the nomination, focusing on macro-level social work. At this time Zirkelbach works as consultant and documentarian for an urban farming project in Flint, Michigan.

Electoral history
Zirkelbach was first elected to the Iowa House in 2004 with 8,712 votes, defeating incumbent Republican opponent Gene Manternach.  He was reelected in 2006 with 8,447 votes, running unopposed.  He was reelected in 2008 with 9,818 votes, defeating Republican opponent Dena Himes in a campaign that focused on ethanol, wind energy, and veterans affairs.

Zirkelbach endorsed U.S. Senator Christopher Dodd in the 2008 Democratic presidential primaries.  He proposed a ban on the sale of imported flags (U.S. flag or Iowa state flag) in Iowa. He lost his bid for reelection in 2010 with 5,431 votes, losing to Republican Lee Hein.

*incumbent

References

External links

 
 Ray Zirkelbach official Iowa General Assembly site
Ray Zirkelbach State Representative official constituency site
 

1978 births
Living people
United States Army personnel of the Iraq War
United States Army soldiers
People from Monticello, Iowa
American prison officers
University of Wyoming alumni
People from Manchester, Iowa
Democratic Party members of the Iowa House of Representatives
Iowa National Guard personnel